Norma Jean may refer to:
Norma Jean (band), a metalcore band from Douglasville, Georgia, U.S.
Norma Jean (singer) (born 1938), American country music singer
Norma Jean (album), a 1978 album by Norma Jean Wright

People with the given names
Jeanne Pruett or Norma Jean Bowman (born 1937), American country music singer 
Norma Jeane Mortenson or Marilyn Monroe, actress
Norma Jean Wright, R&B vocalist and former lead singer of Chic

See also 
 Candle in the Wind, a 1974 Elton John song
"Norma Jean Riley", a 1992 single by Diamond Rio from Diamond Rio

pt:Norma Jean